Tasu'a is the ninth day of Muharram and the day before Ashura. Several events occurred on this day, including: Shemr's entrance to Karbala, the granting of safe conduct for the children of Umm ul-Banin, preparation for war; and Husayn ibn Ali and his companions were besieged by the enemy (as part of the Battle of Karbala). The day is attributed to Abbas ibn Ali because of his actions as commander in the army of Husayn ibn Ali.

Etymology
Tasu'a literally is a variant from the Arabic word 'ninth' (Arabic: تاسع tāsi‘) and in the Islamic calendar refers to the ninth day of Muharram.

Events of Tasu'a
The following are the main events of Tasu'a:

Shemr's entrance to Karbala
In the forenoon of Tasu'a, Shemr, accompanied by a four thousand-man army, arrived at Karbala. He brought a letter from Ubayd Ullah ibn Ziyad to Umar ibn Sa'ad, telling him to take Bay'ah from Husayn or fight.

Safe conduct for the children of Umm ul-Banin
Shemr was one of the tribesman of Umm ul-Banin. He was given a guarantee of safe conduct from Ubayd Allah ibn Ziyad for children of Umm ul-Banin in Tasu'a. He asked Abbas ibn Ali and his brothers to abandon Husayn ibn Ali and obey Yazid. Abbas didn't accept his safe conduct and answered him: "God curse you and your safe conduct! You give us safe conduct and you do not give safe conduct to the grandson of the Prophet of God? And you are asking us to enter the obedience of the cursed people and those who are children of cursed people?"

Preparing for war
After rejection of the safe conduct by Abbas and his brothers, Umar ibn Sa'ad ordered his army to attack Husayn's camp. When Husayn ibn Ali understood their intent, he asked his brother to go to them and ask about his plan. Abbas ibn Ali, Zuhayr ibn Qayn, Habib ibn Madhahir and a few others went and asked them. They answered that our governor ordered us to ask you to Bay'ah him and his rule or fight. Abbas returned to Husayn and said their message. "Go back to them and ask them to give us this evening as a respite till tomorrow so that we may pray to our Lord, supplicate to Him, and seek His forgiveness, for He knows how much I love prayers, the recitation of His Book, the abundance of invocations, and the seeking of His forgiveness", Husayn said to Abbas. Abbas went back to the army and said them the message. Umar Ibn Sa'ad agreed to delay the war until the next day.

Siege of Karbala
In a Hadith by Ja'far al-Sadiq it is said: "Ninth of Muharram is the day, when Imam Husayn and his companions were besieged at Karbala by the army of Syria from all sides and offloaded their luggage. The son of Marjanah (Ubaydullah bin Ziyad) and Umar ibn Sa’ad were pleased at the large number of their army and they deemed Imam and his companions to be weak. They knew that Imam Husayn had no helpers or aides in Iraq. May my father be ransom upon the oppressed traveler."

Rituals

In the days of Tesua and Ashura, Shia Muslims go to mosques and Takiehs or go to mourning ceremonies.  They recite Ahadith and poems in honor of Abbas ibn Ali. In general, the mourning ceremonies consist of processions, chanting and self-flagellation. One of the oldest and most common traditions among Muslims is to wish for something from Allah while also promising to feed people. In Iran this tradition is well-established and reaches its climax on Tasua and Ashura (the 9th and 10th of Muharram) when mourners are fed.

Ta'zieh as a religious play is an old traditional practice for mourning in some cities and villages. Participants see the Ta'zieh as a part of ritual mourning and not as a common play where actors have to memorize their scripts. In other words, the actors read from the script.

Relation with Abbas ibn Ali
This day is devoted to Abbas ibn Ali in Shia communities, because of his bravery as the standard-bearer of Husayn's army in the Battle of Karbala.

Gallery

See also
 Mourning of Muharram
 Arba'een
 Battle of Karbala
 Ashura

References

History of Islam
Ismailism
Family of Muhammad
Mourning of Muharram
Islamic holy days
Islamic terminology
Karbala